Wistanstow is a civil parish in Shropshire, England.  It contains 37 listed buildings that are recorded in the National Heritage List for England.  Of these, three are listed at Grade II*, the middle of the three grades, and the others are at Grade II, the lowest grade. The parish contains villages including Wistanstow, Cheney Longville, Felhampton, and Strefford, but is mainly rural.  Most of the listed buildings are houses, including two former manor houses, cottages, farmhouses and farm buildings, the earlier of which are timber framed.  One of the farms contains material originally part of Cheney Longville Castle.  The other listed buildings include two churches and items in a churchyard, a former corn mill converted into houses, four milestones, a former pumphouse, and two telephone kiosks.


Key

Buildings

References

Citations

Sources

Lists of buildings and structures in Shropshire